Ramón Carretero Marciags (born 26 November 1990) is a Panamanian racing cyclist, who is currently suspended from the sport due to an anti-doping violation. He raced in the 2014 Giro d'Italia, but withdrew after not finishing stage 7.

Doping
On 9 June 2015 the UCI confirmed that Carretero had tested positive for EPO on 22 April, during the Tour of Turkey.

Major results

2009
1st Tanara — Puente de BayanoPanama
1st  Under-23 National Time Trial Championships
1st Overall Tour Ciclístico de Panamá
1st Stages 1 & 5
2010
1st Under-23 Juegos Centroamericanos Time Trial Championships
3rd Juegos Centroamericanos Time Trial Championships
1st Overall Tour Ciclístico de Panamá
1st Stages 1 (TTT), 5 & 6
1st Stage 6 (TTT) Vuelta a Chiriquí
2011
1st Pan American Under-23 Time Trial Championships
1st  National Under-23 Time Trial Championships
1st  National Time Trial Championships
1st Stage 1 (TTT) Tour Ciclístico de Panamá
1st Overall Tour Ciclístico de Panamá
1st Stage 5
1st Overall Vuelta a Chiriquí
1st Stages 1, 4 (TTT) & 10
2012
1st  National Time Trial Championships
1st Overall Tour Ciclístico de Panamá
1st Stages 1 (TTT), 3, 4 & 5
2013
3rd National Time Trial Championships
5th Overall Vuelta a Chiriquí

See also
List of doping cases in cycling

References

External links
 

1990 births
Living people
Panamanian male cyclists
Place of birth missing (living people)
Doping cases in cycling